Dean Berta Viñales (20 April 2006 – 25 September 2021) was a Spanish professional motorcycle racer. He competed in the Supersport 300 World Championship for the Viñales Racing Team on a Yamaha YZF-R3.

Berta Viñales was the cousin of Maverick Viñales, a Moto3 world champion and Isaac Viñales, who has competed in the 125cc, Moto3, Moto2 and Supersport World Championships.

Career
Berta Viñales debuted in the Supersport 300 World Championship in 2021, where he started in 11 races, reaching his best result in fourth place in the race held at the Circuit de Nevers Magny-Cours.

Death
Berta Viñales died as a result of injuries sustained in an accident during the first race of the Jerez round. At the first turn of the circuit, there was a multi-rider crash, and after falling to the ground he was run over by other riders. He was the first Supersport 300 rider to die from injuries in a race.

At 3:11 p.m. on the same day of the accident, the organization published the following message on its social networks: We are deeply saddened to report the death of Dean Berta Viñales. The Superbike family sends their love to family, loved ones and their team. His personality, enthusiasm and commitment will be greatly missed. Everyone in motorcycle racing will miss you, Dean. Travel in peace.

Legacy
Following three teenage deaths during the 2021 motorcycle road racing season with ages 14, 19 and Berta Viñales at 15, the organisers FIM and Dorna have introduced new minimum-age requirements rising from 16 to 18 in major road racing competitions from 2023, together with reduced grid sizes and with other restrictions for lesser series.

Career statistics

Supersport 300 World Championship

Races by year
(key) (Races in bold indicate pole position; races in italics indicate fastest lap)

References

2006 births
2021 deaths
Filmed deaths in motorsport
People from Alt Empordà
Sportspeople from the Province of Girona
Spanish motorcycle racers
Sportsmen from Catalonia
Motorcycle racers from Catalonia
Motorcycle racers who died while racing
Sport deaths in Spain
Supersport 300 World Championship riders